Jhonnattann Benites da Conceiçao (born 27 July 1989) is a Brazilian footballer who plays as an attacking midfielder for Najran.

References

Brazilian footballers
1989 births
Living people
Maltese Premier League players
Saudi Professional League players
UAE Pro League players
Saudi First Division League players
Volta Redonda FC players
Birkirkara F.C. players
Al-Muharraq SC players
Valletta F.C. players
Al Batin FC players
Al-Taawoun FC players
Fujairah FC players
Al-Sahel SC (Saudi Arabia) players
Al-Kholood Club players
Najran SC players
Brazilian expatriate footballers
Expatriate footballers in Saudi Arabia
Brazilian expatriate sportspeople in Saudi Arabia
Expatriate footballers in Malta
Brazilian expatriate sportspeople in Malta
Expatriate footballers in Bahrain
Brazilian expatriate sportspeople in Bahrain
Expatriate footballers in the United Arab Emirates
Brazilian expatriate sportspeople in the United Arab Emirates
Association football midfielders